Periyar E.V.R. College is a general degree college located in Tiruchirappalli, Tamil Nadu. It was established in the year 1965. The college is affiliated with Bharathidasan University. This college offers different courses in arts, commerce and science.

Departments

Science
Statistics
Chemistry
Physics
Mathematics
Computer Science
Geography
Botany
Zoology
Biochemistry

Arts and Commerce

 Tamil
 English
 History
 Economics
 Commerce

Application

BCA

Accreditation
The college is  recognized by the University Grants Commission (UGC).

References

External links
http://periyarevrcollege.ac.in/

Educational institutions established in 1965
1965 establishments in Madras State
Colleges affiliated to Bharathidasan University
Universities and colleges in Tiruchirappalli
Periyar E. V. Ramasamy